Fantastic Voyage is a 1966 American science fiction adventure film directed by Richard Fleischer and written by Harry Kleiner, based on a story by Otto Klement and Jerome Bixby. The film is about a submarine crew who is shrunk to microscopic size and venture into the body of an injured scientist to repair damage to his brain. Kleiner abandoned all but the concept of miniaturization and added a Cold War element. The film starred Stephen Boyd, Raquel Welch, Edmond O'Brien, Donald Pleasence, and Arthur Kennedy.

Bantam Books obtained the rights for a paperback novelization based on the screenplay and approached Isaac Asimov to write it.
Because the novelization was released six months before the movie, many people mistakenly believed that the film was based on Asimov's book. Its modern and imaginative production design received five nominations at the 39th Academy Awards mostly in technical departments, winning for Best Visual Effects and Best Art Direction in Color.

The movie used the concept of miniaturization in science fiction along with The Incredible Shrinking Man and inspired an animated television series of the same name.

Plot
The United States and the Soviet Union have both developed technology that can miniaturize matter by shrinking individual atoms, but only for one hour.

A scientist. Dr. Jan Benes, working behind the Iron Curtain, has figured out how to make the process work indefinitely. With the help of American intelligence agents, including agent Charles Grant, he escapes to the West and arrives in New York City, but an attempted assassination leaves him comatose with a blood clot in his brain that no surgery can remove from the outside.

To save his life, Grant, Navy pilot Captain Bill Owens, medical chief and circulatory specialist Dr. Michaels, surgeon Dr. Peter Duval, and his assistant Cora Peterson are placed aboard a Navy ichthyology submarine at the Combined Miniature Deterrent Forces facilities. The submarine, named Proteus, is then miniaturized to "about the size of a microbe", and injected into Benes' body. The team has 60 minutes to get to and remove the clot; after this, Proteus and its crew will begin reverting to their normal size, become vulnerable to Benes's immune system, and kill Benes.

The crew faces many obstacles during the mission. An undetected arteriovenous fistula forces them to detour through the heart, where cardiac arrest must be induced to, at best, reduce turbulence that would be strong enough to destroy Proteus. As the crew faces an unexplained loss of oxygen and must replenish their supply in the lungs, Grant finds the surgical laser needed to destroy the clot was damaged from the turbulence in the heart, as it was not fastened down as it had been before: this and his safety line snapping loose while the crew was refilling their air supply has Grant begin to suspect a saboteur is on the mission. The crew must cannibalize their wireless radio to repair the laser, cutting off all communication and guidance from the outside, although because the submarine is nuclear-powered, surgeons and technicians outside Benes's body are still able to track their movements via a radioactive tracer, allowing General Alan Carter and Colonel Donald Reid, the officers in charge of CMDF, to figure out the crew's strategies as they make their way through the body. The crew is then forced to pass through the inner ear, requiring all outside personnel to make no noise to prevent destructive shocks, but while the crew is removing reticular fibers clogging the submarine's vents and making the engines overheat, a fallen surgical tool causes the crew to be thrown about and Peterson is nearly killed by antibodies, but they are able to reboard the submarine in time. By the time they finally reach the clot, the crew has only six minutes remaining to operate and then exit the body.

Before the mission, Grant had been briefed that Duval was the prime suspect as a potential surgical assassin, but as the mission progresses, he instead begins to suspect Michaels. During the surgery, Dr. Michaels knocks out Owens and takes control of Proteus while the rest of the crew is outside for the operation. As Duval finishes removing the clot with the laser, Michaels tries to crash the submarine into the same area of Benes' brain to kill him. Grant fires the laser at the ship, causing it to veer away and crash, and Michaels to get trapped in the wreckage with the controls pinning him to the seat, which attracts the attention of white blood cells. While Grant saves Owens from the Proteus, Michaels is killed when a white blood cell consumes the ship. The remaining crew quickly swim to one of Benes' eyes and escape through a tear duct seconds before returning to normal size.

Cast
 Stephen Boyd as Charles Grant, a CIA Agent enlisted to protect Benes
 Raquel Welch as Cora Peterson, the technical assistant for Dr. Duval
 Edmond O'Brien as General Alan Carter, one of the officers in charge of Combined Miniature Deterrent Forces
 Donald Pleasence as Dr. Michaels, CMDF's medical chief and a circulatory specialist later revealed to be the saboteur of the mission
 Arthur O'Connell as Colonel Donald Reid, the operational commander for Combined Miniature Deterrent Forces
 William Redfield as Captain Bill Owens, a U.S. Navy officer who designed the Proteus for his branch's research and development program
 Arthur Kennedy as Dr. Peter Duval, a top-class brain surgeon enlisted to perform the surgery on Benes
 Jean Del Val as Dr. Jan Benes, the comatose scientist who perfected the formula for unlimited miniaturization
 Barry Coe as communications aide
 Ken Scott as a Secret Service agent
 Shelby Grant as nurse
 James Brolin as technician

Production
The film was the original idea of Otto Klement and Jerome Bixby. They sold it to Fox, which announced the film would be "the most expensive science-fiction film ever made." Richard Fleischer was assigned to direct and Saul David to produce; both men had worked at the studio before. Fleischer had originally studied medicine and human anatomy in college before choosing to be a movie director. Harry Kleiner was brought in to work on the script.

The budget was set at $5 million. The budget went up to $6 million, $3 million of which went on the sets and $1 million on test footage.

The Proteus submarine was constructed as a full-size set piece 42 feet long, first seen in the "miniaturizer" room and later in scenes set outside the lung and inside the inner ear, when the cast was to be seen "swimming" (actually suspended by wires) outside the submarine. The full-size Proteus mockup contained all the interior sets that the actors are seen in to represent the interior of the submarine, with sections that could be pulled out to allow for cameras and crew to film the interior. The submarine was also constructed in miniature, including a large miniature around five feet in length that could be flown on wires in the abstract sets representing the inside of the human body. The heart and brain sets built to accommodate the five-foot miniature filled a soundstage on the Fox lot—these were filmed "dry for wet," with floating, blob-shaped elements meant to be blood cells filmed separately and composited over the footage. A smaller, 18-inch miniature of the Proteus was constructed to operate in liquid for a shot of the submarine bursting through an arterial wall early in the movie. A tiny Proteus miniature just a few inches in length was made for the miniaturization sequence to show the ship being picked up by a "precision handling device" and dropped into a large glass cylinder which was then miniaturized to become part of a syringe that would inject the Proteus into the brain-injured scientist.

The film starred Stephen Boyd, making his first Hollywood movie in five years. It was the first role at Fox for Raquel Welch, who was put under contract to the studio after being spotted in a beauty contest by David's wife.

For the technical and artistic elaboration of the subject, Fleischer asked for the collaboration of two people of the crew that he had worked with on the production of 20,000 Leagues Under the Sea, the film he directed for Walt Disney in 1954. The designer of the Nautilus from the Jules Verne adaptation, Harper Goff, also designed the Proteus; the same technical advisor, Fred Zendar, collaborated on both productions.

At one point in the movie's preproduction it was positioned as one of the Derek Flint spy spoof movies starring James Coburn, which were produced by 20th Century Fox and Saul David. Several script pages sampled in the bonus features of the 2012 DVD release of Fantastic Voyage show Stephen Boyd's Grant character (who, like Flint, is a secret agent) being identified as Flint, and some of Flint's wisecracks about not wanting to be miniaturized survive to be uttered by Boyd's Grant in Fantastic Voyage. Years later comic actor Mike Myers proposed making an installment of his own Austin Powers spy spoof movies called Shagtastic Voyage, in which Powers would be injected into the body of Dr. Evil.

The plasma effect was produced by chief operator Ernest Laszlo via the use of multicolored turning lights, placed on the outside of translucent decors.

"There are no precedents so we must proceed by trial and error", said David.

Frederick Schodt's book The Astro Boy Essays: Osamu Tezuka, Mighty Atom, and the Manga/Anime Revolution claims that Fox had wanted to use ideas from an episode of Japanese animator Osamu Tezuka's Astro Boy in the film, but it never credited him.

Isaac Asimov, asked to write the novelization from the script, declared that the script was full of plot holes, and received permission to write the book the way he wanted. The novel came out first because he wrote quickly and because of delays in filming.

Biological issues and accuracy
In the film, the crew (apart from the saboteur) manage to leave Benes's body safely before reverting to normal size, but the Proteus remains inside, as do the remains of the saboteur's body (albeit digested by a white blood cell), and several gallons (full scale) of a carrier solution (presumably saline) used in the injection syringe. Isaac Asimov pointed out that this was a serious logical flaw in the plot, since the submarine (even if reduced to bits of debris) would also revert to normal size, killing Benes in the process. Therefore, in his novelization Asimov had the crew provoke the white cell into following them, so that it drags the submarine to the tear duct, and its wreckage expands outside Benes's body. Asimov solved the problem of the syringe fluid by having the staff inject only a very small amount of miniaturized fluid into Benes, minimizing its effect on him when it expands.

Music
The score was composed and conducted by Leonard Rosenman. The composer deliberately wrote no music for the first four reels of the film, before the protagonists enter the human body. Rosenman wrote that "the harmony for the entire score is almost completely atonal except for the very end when our heroes grow to normality".

Reception
The film received mostly positive reviews and a few criticisms. The weekly entertainment-trade magazine Variety gave the film a positive pre-release review, stating, "The lavish production, boasting some brilliant special effects and superior creative efforts, is an entertaining, enlightening excursion through inner space—the body of a man." Bosley Crowther of The New York Times wrote, "Yessir, for straight science-fiction, this is quite a film—the most colorful and imaginative since Destination Moon" (1950). Richard Schickel of Life magazine wrote that the rewards would be "plentiful" to audiences who get over the "real whopper" of suspended disbelief required. He found that though the excellent special effects and sets could distract from the scenery's scientific purpose in the story, the "old familiar music of science fiction" in lush new arrangements was a "true delight", and the seriousness with which screenwriter Kleiner and director Fleischer treated the story made it more believable and fun. Schickel made note of, but dismissed, other critics' allegations of "camp."

, the film holds a 91% approval rating at review aggregator Rotten Tomatoes from 33 reviews, with an average rating of 7/10. The website's critics consensus reads: "The special effects may be a bit dated today, but Fantastic Voyage still holds up well as an imaginative journey into the human body."

Box office
According to Fox records, the film needed to earn $9,400,000 in rentals to break even and made $8,880,000, meaning it initially showed a slight loss, but television sales moved it into the black, and subsequent home video sales were almost entirely profit.

Awards and honors
The film won two Academy Awards and was nominated for three more:
 Academy Awards (1966)
Won: Best Art Direction – Color (Jack Martin Smith, Dale Hennesy, Walter M. Scott, Stuart A. Reiss)
Won: Best Special Effects (Art Cruickshank)
Nominated: Best Cinematography (Ernest Laszlo)
Nominated: Best Film Editing (William B. Murphy)
Nominated: Best Sound Editing (Walter Rossi)

Novelization

After acquiring the film's paperback novelization rights, Bantam Books approached Isaac Asimov to write the novelization, offering him a flat sum of $5,000 with no royalties involved. In his autobiography In Joy Still Felt, Asimov writes, "I turned down the proposal out of hand. Hackwork, I said. Beneath my dignity." However, Bantam Books persisted, and at a meeting with Marc Jaffe and Marcia Nassiter on April 21, 1965, Asimov agreed to read the screenplay.

In the novelization's introduction, Asimov states that he was reluctant to write the book because he believed that the miniaturization of matter was physically impossible, but he decided that it was still good fodder for story-telling and that it could still make for some intelligent reading. In addition, 20th Century Fox was known to want someone with some science-fiction clout to help promote the film. Aside from the initial "impossibility" of the shrinking machine, Asimov went to great lengths to portray with great accuracy what it would actually be like to be reduced to infinitesimal scale. He discussed the ability of the lights on the submarine to penetrate normal matter, issues of time distortion, and other side effects that the movie does not address. Asimov was also bothered by the way the wreck of Proteus was left in Benes. In a subsequent meeting with Jaffe, he insisted that he would have to change the ending so that the submarine was brought out. Asimov also felt the need to gain permission from his usual science-fiction publisher, Doubleday, to write the novel. Doubleday did not object, and had suggested his name to Bantam in the first place. Asimov began work on the novel on May 31, and completed it on July 23.

Asimov did not want any of his books, even a film novelization, to appear only in paperback, so in August, he persuaded Austin Olney of Houghton Mifflin to publish a hardcover edition, assuring him that the book would sell at least 8000 copies, which it did. However, since the rights to the story were held by Otto Klement, who had co-written the original story treatment, Asimov would not be entitled to any royalties. By the time the hardcover edition was published in March 1966, Houghton Mifflin had persuaded Klement to allow Asimov to have a quarter of the royalties. Klement also negotiated for The Saturday Evening Post to serialize an abridged version of the novel, and he agreed to give Asimov half the payment for it. Fantastic Voyage (abridged to half its length) appeared in the February 26 and March 12, 1966, issues of the Post. Bantam Books released the paperback edition of the novel in September 1966 to coincide with the release of the film. Harry Harrison, reviewing the Asimov novelization, called it a "Jerry-built monstrosity", praising the descriptions of science-fiction events as "Asimov at his best", while condemning the narrative framework as "inane drivel".

Later adaptations

Related novels and comics
The film was adapted into a video game for Atari 2600 in 1982 by Fox Video Games.

Fantastic Voyage II: Destination Brain (1987) was written by Isaac Asimov as an attempt to develop and present his own story apart from the 1966 screenplay. This novel is not a sequel to the original, but instead is a separate story taking place in the Soviet Union with an entirely different set of characters.

Fantastic Voyage: Microcosm is a third interpretation, written by Kevin J. Anderson, published in 2001. This version has the crew of the Proteus explore the body of a dead alien that crash-lands on earth, and updates the story with such modern concepts as nanotechnology (replacing killer white cells).

A comic book adaptation of the film was released by Gold Key Comics in 1967. Drawn by Wally Wood, the book followed the plot of the movie with general accuracy, but many scenes were depicted differently and/or outright dropped, and the ending was given an epilogue similar as that seen in some of the early draft scripts for the film.

A parody of the film titled "Fantastecch Voyage" was published in Mad Magazine. It was illustrated by Mort Drucker and written by Larry Siegel, two members of the "Usual Gang of Idiots", in regular issue #110, April 1967. The advertising-business-themed spoof has the crew—from L.S.M.F.T. (Laboratory Sector for Making Folks Tiny)—sent to inject decongestant into a badly plugged-up nose.

1968 animated television series

Similarly-themed works

 The Invisible Enemy, a 1977 four-part serial of the British TV series Doctor Who is said to have been inspired by the film. In it, the Doctor's body is possessed by an evil virus, so a doctor creates clones of  his companion Leela and himself to enter his head to search for the virus and destroy it.
 The 1987 film Innerspace follows a similar plotline, this time concerning a test pilot being miniaturized and injected into a store clerk, although accidentally.
 The live-action/animated comedy film Osmosis Jones stars a white cell cop trying to stop a deadly virus from destroying the human he guards.
The concept of entering the human body popularized by Fantastic Voyage has been greatly influential especially in animated TV shows, of which there are several examples:
 Captain Planet and the Planeteers episode "An Inside Job" features The Planeteers battling water-borne parasites in Kwame's body so that he can recover.
 SpongeBob SquarePants episode "Squidtastic Voyage" spoofs the film, with SpongeBob and Patrick attempting to retrieve Squidward's clarinet reed after he swallows it. Other Nicktoons have used the Fantastic Voyage template, such as the Rugrats episode "The Inside Story", involving the babies being forced to shrink down and enter Chuckie's body to retrieve a watermelon seed, The Angry Beavers episode, "Vantastic Voyage", where the scientists go inside Dag's body, the Fairly OddParents episode "Tiny Timmy!", which has Timmy being shrunk down by Cosmo and Wanda to enter Vicky's body in order to study for school, and The Adventures of Jimmy Neutron: Boy Genius episode, "Journey to the Center of Carl", where Jimmy and his friends go inside Carl's body, among others.
 Children's educational TV series The Magic School Bus had a number of episodes involving the bus going inside a human: "For Lunch" and "Inside Ralphie" in the first season, "Flexes Its Muscles" in the second season, "Works Out" in the third season and "Goes Cellular" and "Makes a Stink" in the final season, dealing with the topics of Digestion, Germs, Body Mechanics, Circulation, Cells and Smelling respectively.
 The Iron Man animated TV series features the episode "Iron Man, On the Inside", in which Iron Man must go inside Hawkeye to save him.
 Dexter's Laboratory episode "Fantastic Boyage" features Dexter attempting to inject himself into Dee Dee to find a cure for the common cold, inadvertently winding up inside his dog.
 Futurama episode "Parasites Lost" involves the Planet Express crew sending microscopic copies of themselves inside Fry to save him from parasites.
 Family Guy episode "Emission Impossible" has Stewie shrinking down and going inside of Peter's testicles to prevent him and Lois from having another baby.
 Both Teen Titans and Teen Titans Go! feature episodes in which either Beast Boy or Robin enter Cyborg's body to cure him.
 The Simpsons' fifteenth iteration of Treehouse of Horror sees in its third leg a trip into Mr. Burns's body to rescue Maggie after she gets shrunk down into a pill and ingested.
 Phineas and Ferb episode "Journey to the Center of Candace" features Phineas and Ferb building a shrinking submarine to enter Isabella's chihuahua, but accidentally ending up inside their sister Candace.
 Batman: The Brave and the Bold episode "Journey to the Center of the Bat!" has Atom and Aquaman traveling through Batman's body to cure him.
 Regular Show episode "Cool Cubed" features Mordecai and Rigby shrinking and traveling into Thomas's brain to stop it from freezing.
 Rick and Morty episode "Anatomy Park" involves Rick shrinking Morty down to fit in a homeless man dressed as Santa Claus to assist with the amusement park he was trying to operate inside of him.
 Archer two-part season 6 finale "Drastic Voyage" directly spoofs the film.

Cancelled sequel/remake plans
Plans for a sequel or remake have been in discussion since at least 1984, but as of the beginning of July 2015, the project remained stuck in development hell. In 1984, Isaac Asimov was approached to write Fantastic Voyage II, out of which a movie would be made. Asimov "was sent a suggested outline" that mirrored the movie Innerspace and "involved two vessels in the bloodstream, one American and one Soviet, and what followed was a kind of submicroscopic version of World War III." Asimov was against such an approach. Following a dispute between publishers, the original commissioners of the novel approached Philip José Farmer, who "wrote a novel and sent [in] the manuscript" that was rejected despite "stick[ing] tightly to the outline [that was sent to Asimov]." "It dealt with World War III in the bloodstream, and it was full of action and excitement." Although Asimov urged the publisher to accept Farmer's manuscript, it was insisted that Asimov write the novel. So, Asimov eventually wrote the book in his own way (completely different in plot from what [Farmer] had written), which was eventually published by Doubleday in 1987 as Fantastic Voyage II and "dealt not with competing submarines in the bloodstream, but with one submarine, with [an] American hero cooperating (not entirely voluntarily) with four Soviet crew members." The novel was not made into a movie, however.

James Cameron was also interested in directing a remake (since at least 1997), but decided to devote his efforts to his Avatar project. He still remained open to the idea of producing a feature based on his own screenplay, and in 2007, 20th Century Fox announced that pre-production on the project was finally underway. Roland Emmerich agreed to direct, but rejected the script written by Cameron. Marianne and Cormac Wibberley were hired to write a new script, but the 2007–2008 Writers Guild of America strike delayed filming, and Emmerich began working on 2012 instead.

In spring 2010, Paul Greengrass was considering directing the remake from a script written by Shane Salerno and produced by James Cameron, but later dropped out to be replaced by Shawn Levy. It was intended that the film be shot in native stereoscopic 3D.

In January 2016, The Hollywood Reporter reported that Guillermo del Toro was in talks to direct the reboot by reteaming with David S. Goyer, who was writing the film's script with Justin Rhodes with Cameron still on the film by his production company Lightstorm Entertainment. In August 2017, it was reported that del Toro had postponed working on the film to completely focus on his film The Shape of Water, due to release the same year, and he would start pre-production in spring 2018 and would begin filming in the fall of the same year for a 2020 release.

See also
 List of American films of 1966
 List of films featuring miniature people
 Microsurgery

References

External links
 
 
 
 
 
 

Human body in popular culture
1966 films
1960s science fiction action films
American science fiction action films
Cold War submarine films
1960s English-language films
Films scored by Leonard Rosenman
Films adapted into television shows
Films directed by Richard Fleischer
Films that won the Best Visual Effects Academy Award
Films whose art director won the Best Art Direction Academy Award
Medical-themed films
Science fiction submarine films
Films about size change
Films about the Central Intelligence Agency
Films adapted into comics
Films with screenplays by David Duncan (writer)
Films with screenplays by Harry Kleiner
American children's adventure films
20th Century Studios franchises
1960s American films